Wagner Marseille (born 13 September 1970) is a retired Haiti athlete who specialised in the 110 metres hurdles. He represented his country at the 1996 Summer Olympics, as well as three outdoor and two indoor World Championships.

He has personal bests of 13.75 seconds in the 110 metres hurdles (Bridgetown 1999) and 7.70 seconds in the 60 metres hurdles (Blacksburg 2000).

Competition record

References

1970 births
Living people
Haitian male hurdlers
Athletes (track and field) at the 1996 Summer Olympics
Olympic athletes of Haiti
Athletes (track and field) at the 1995 Pan American Games
Athletes (track and field) at the 1999 Pan American Games
Pan American Games competitors for Haiti
Central American and Caribbean Games silver medalists for Haiti
Competitors at the 1993 Central American and Caribbean Games
World Athletics Championships athletes for Haiti
Central American and Caribbean Games medalists in athletics
Competitors at the 1995 Summer Universiade